The 1994 USC Trojans football team represented the University of Southern California (USC) in the 1994 NCAA Division I-A football season. In their ninth year under head coach John Robinson, the Trojans compiled an 8–3–1 record (6–2 against conference opponents), finished in second place in the Pacific-10 Conference (Pac-10), and outscored their opponents by a combined total of 356 to 243.

Quarterback Rob Johnson led the team in passing, completing 186 of 276 passes for 2,499 yards with 15 touchdowns and six interceptions. Shawn Walters led the team in rushing with 193 carries for 976 yards and 11 touchdowns. Keyshawn Johnson led the team in receiving with 66 catches for 1,362 yards and nine touchdowns.

Schedule

Roster

Season summary

Washington

Penn State

Baylor

Shawn Walters 31 rushes, 207 yards

Oregon

Oregon State

Stanford

Shawn Walters 31 rushes, 234 yards

California

Washington State

Arizona

UCLA

Notre Dame

Cotton Bowl Classic

References

USC
USC Trojans football seasons
Cotton Bowl Classic champion seasons
USC Trojans football